The beetle subfamily Curculioninae is part of the weevil family Curculionidae. It contains over 23,500 described species in 2,200 genera, and is therefore the largest weevil subfamily. Given that the beetle order (Coleoptera) contains about one-quarter of all known organisms, the Curculioninae represent one of the – if not the – most successful radiations of terrestrial Metazoa.

Many weevils of this group are commonly known as flower weevils or acorn and nut weevils, after a food commonly eaten by Curculioninae larvae and imagines — the reproductive organs of plants.

Systematics 
This large subfamily is divided into around 30 tribes. Delimitation of the Curculioninae is fairly robust considering its enormous size; there is some dispute, however, in their exact boundary with the Molytinae. The Phrynixini and Trypetidini are also included in the Curculioninae by some authors, but more often they are considered Molytinae; conversely, the Itini are usually placed in the Curculioninae but sometimes in the Molytinae, which are also expanded by certain authors to include, among others, the whole Cryptorhynchinae. These, as well as the Ceutorhynchinae, are sometimes included in the Curculioninae as additional tribes Cryptorhynchini and Ceutorhynchini. And some genera while almost certainly Curculioninae, are too unusual and/or ancient to be easily assigned to a specific tribe.

Features used to distinguish some of the tribes are:

List of tribes

The subfamily Curculioninae consists of the following tribes:
Some notable genera are also listed.

 Acalyptini Thomson, 1859
 Acalyptus
 Anchylorhynchus
 AcentriniSeidlitz, 1890
 Acentrusini Alonso-Zarazaga, 2005
 Ancylocnemidini Voss, 1962
 Anoplini Bedel, 1884
 Anthonomini Thomson, 1859
 Anthonomus
 Brachonyx
 Camarotini Schönherr, 1833
 Ceratopodini Lacordaire, 1863
 Cionini Schönherr, 1825
 Cionus
 Cranopoeini Kuschel, 2009
 Cryptoplini Lacordaire, 1863
 Curculionini Latreille, 1802
 Curculio
 Derelomini Lacordaire, 1865
 Diabathrariini Lacordaire, 1863
 Ellescini Thomson, 1859
 Dorytomus
 Ellescus
 Erodiscini Lacordaire, 1863
 Eugnomini Lacordaire, 1863
 Meriphus

 Pactolotypus

 Geochini Zimmerman, 1994
 Gonipterini Lacordaire, 1863
 Gonipterus
 Itini Reitter, 1913
 Mecinini Gistel, 1848
 Mecinus
 Rhinusa
 Neosharpiini Hoffmann, 1956
 Nerthopini Lacordaire, 1865
 Otidocephalini Lacordaire, 1863
 Piazorhinini Lacordaire, 1863
 Prionobrachiini Hustache, 1938
 Pyropini Lacordaire, 1865
 Rhamphini Rafinesque, 1815
 Rhynchaenus
 Smicronychini Seidlitz, 1891
 Sphaeriopoeini Kuschel, 2003
 Storeini Lacordaire, 1863
 Glaucopela

 Peristoreus
 Styphlini Jekel, 1861
 Pseudostyphlus
 Tychiini Gistel, 1848
 Lignyodes
 Tychius
 Ulomascini Lacordaire, 1865
 Misophrice

 Viticiini Morimoto, 1983

See also
 List of Curculioninae genera

Footnotes

References

External links 

 
Beetle subfamilies